Ōe, Oe or Ooe (written:  lit. "large bay") is a Japanese surname. Notable people with the surname include:

, princess of ancient Japan
, the son of Kenzaburō Ōe
, Japanese rower
, Japanese snowboarder
, Japanese novelist
, Japanese professional wrestler
, Japanese screenwriter
, Japanese electronic musician known as Captain Funk

Japanese-language surnames